Karl Emil Schäfer (17 December 1891 – 5 June 1917) was a German pilot during World War I; he became one of the major German flying aces of the war, with 30 confirmed aerial victories.

Early life and infantry service
Schäfer was born in Krefeld and joined the Jäger Regiment zu Pferde Nr. 10 of the Prussian Army for his One-year volunteer military service. An engineering student who spoke fluent French and English, he was a fine draughtsman, and was studying in Paris when the war broke out, but managed to return to Germany and was assigned to the Reserve Jäger Bataillon 7 in Bückeburg.  He won the Iron Cross 2nd class and was promoted to Vizefeldwebel during September 1914, before being badly wounded and hospitalised for six months. After returning to the front line he was commissioned as Leutnant in May 1915.

Flying service
Requesting flying duties Schäfer trained as a pilot and served over the Eastern Front with Kampfgeschwader 2 from July 1916 onwards. He moved to the west and now flew with Kampfstaffel 11 of KG 2, where he gained his first victory. With just this single victory, he impudently telegraphed Manfred von Richthofen, who was assembling a "top gun" (kanone) squadron at Jasta 11, "Can you use me?" Richthofen replied, "You have already been requested."

Schäfer was then posted to Jasta 11 on 21 February 1917. In intensive operations during Bloody April he became a flying ace, being credited with 21 victories and awarded the Pour le Mérite. While a member of Jasta 11, "Karlchen" (Charlie) became known as the squadron's prankster and recorded many vivid incidents in combat and at play. He flew an Albatros D.III with red and black markings. Somehow amidst all this he found time to pen his autobiography, Vom Jaeger zum Flieger ("From Soldier to Pilot").

Command and death in action
Schäfer was then given command of Jasta 28 on 26 April, and after gaining further victories for a total of 30 claims Schäfer was shot down and killed on 5 June 1917 in combat with No. 20 Squadron. Lt. Thomas Lewis flown by Lt. Harold Satchell disabled his plane, which broke apart in midair and they reported that the Albatros fell in flames. Max Ritter von Müller of Jasta 28 reported seeing it break up, but noted no fire. Photos of the wreckage show no scorching and the wings still attached to the aircraft. His Jasta 28 comrades recovered Schäfer's body, noting that it had no bullet wounds, but that every bone in his body had been broken.

With 29 of his victories flying the Albatros D.III, he was one of the most successful pilots in the type.

Combat record

See also
 List of World War I aces credited with 20 or more victories
 Aerial victory standards of World War I

References
Citations

Bibliography

External links
 IWM Interview with Harold Satchell

1891 births
1917 deaths
Military personnel from Krefeld
People from the Rhine Province
Prussian Army personnel
Luftstreitkräfte personnel
German World War I flying aces
Recipients of the Pour le Mérite (military class)
Recipients of the Iron Cross (1914), 1st class
Recipients of the Iron Cross (1914), 2nd class
Aviators killed by being shot down
German military personnel killed in World War I